The 1913–14 Ottawa Senators season was the 29th season of the Ottawa Hockey Club, sixth season of the National Hockey Association (NHA). Ottawa placed fourth in the NHA, and did not qualify for the playoffs.

Team business
The team signed a two-year deal to return to the Arena. The team was the prime tenant, with games on Wednesdays and Saturdays, and practice time on Tuesdays and Thursdays and more time if needed.

The season was profitable for the club. Receipts were recorded as $25,000, allowing the club to pay off a $4,000 debt from the previous season and record a $3,000 surplus.

Pre-season
Lichtenhein of the Wanderers offered to sell Harry Hyland to Ottawa for $1,500, but was turned down. The team sold the contracts of Fred Lake, Joe Dennison and Clint Benedict to the Toronto Ontarios. Although there was doubt the players would report, Lake and Dennison played for the Ontarios while Benedict returned to the Senators. Allan Wilson was signed as a free agent away from the Maritime Hockey League. A deal was made to ship Skene Ronan to Vancouver for Carl Kendall but Ronan refused to go and turned down all offers from the Vancouver owners.

Regular season

Highlights

Ottawa put together a seven-game winning streak but it was not enough as the Canadiens, Toronto and Quebec placed ahead of Ottawa. Percy LeSueur played well in a splitting of the goaltender duties with Clint Benedict, but the team did not have enough offence, scoring only 65 goals in 20 games.

Final standings

Schedule and results

Goaltending averages

Scoring leaders

Playoffs

The Senators did not qualify for the playoffs.

The Vancouver Millionaires came east for exhibition games, playing in Ottawa on March 7, 1914, defeating Ottawa 7–3 with former Ottawa star Fred Taylor excelling for Vancouver.

See also
1913–14 NHA season

References

 
 

Ottawa Senators season
Ottawa Senators (original) seasons